Organic Hallucinosis is the fourth studio album by Polish death metal band Decapitated. The album was released on 7 February 2006 in the United States, on 13 February in Europe and on 22 February in Japan. The release was followed by European and North American tours.

It is Decapitated's only album to feature vocalist Adrian "Covan" Kowanek, and their final album to feature bassist Marcin "Martin" Rygiel and drummer Witold "Vitek" Kiełtyka, in which the latter died at the age of 23 in a tour bus accident in Russia that also seriously injured Covan.

Background and release
In mid-2005, Decapitated's vocalist Wojciech "Sauron" Wąsowicz departed from the band and was replaced by Adrian "Covan" Kowanek. Organic Hallucinosis was recorded in August 2005 at Hertz Studio in Białystok, Poland with producers Slawek and Wojtek Wiesławski and features artwork and layout by Spiros Antoniou (Seth). The album was released by Earache Records on 7 February 2006 in the United States and on 13 February internationally. A music video was filmed for the song "Day 69" and released that year.

A limited edition of 1000 bonus CDs were given away for free by Earache Records for people who purchased Organic Hallucinosis in United Kingdom independent stores. It contains tracks from live at Earache Christmas party, Rescue Rooms, Nottingham, 20 December 2004. A Japanese edition was released by Teichiku Records, which contains live bonus tracks taken from the same recording as the bonus CD.

The album's release was followed by a headlining European tour starting in September 2006 and a North American tour with Suffocation. Later on, Decapitated's bassist Marcin "Martin" Rygiel departed from the band.

In November, Decapitated's tour bus was involved in an automobile accident in Russia that killed drummer Witold "Vitek" Kiełtyka at the age of 23 and seriously injured Covan. The band's guitarist Wacław "Vogg" Kiełtyka announced an indefinite hiatus.

Critical reception 

AllMusic stated about Organic Hallucinosis: "Launching off of their new frontman's more versatile skills in delivering various stages of deathly grunting, the band has stepped up the complexity of their songwriting to match, while establishing a non-traditional death metal aesthetic."

According to Kerrang!, "Decapitated have already released three classic albums; superbly conceived and executed eruptions of technical brilliance and razor-sharp songwriting that have turned these youthful Poles into one of the genre's most widely respected bands. Remarkably, Organic Hallucinosis takes that knack for producing extreme music with integrity and bagfuls of hooks even closer to perfection."

Blabbermouth.net stated later in 2010 about the album, "A hugely forward-thinking and ambitious album, Organic Hallucinosis defined Decapitated's sound and spawned a host of imitators."

Tomas Haake of the Swedish band Meshuggah announced a statement following the death of Vitek: "The metal community has lost one of the most talented and skillful drummers of our time! I remember when I first heard Decapitated's Organic Hallucinosis and it just blew me away! What a band and what a drummer! Vitek was a true talent and drummer genius".

Track listing

Personnel

Decapitated
 Wacław "Vogg" Kiełtyka – guitars
 Witold "Vitek" Kiełtyka – drums
 Adrian "Covan" Kowanek – vocals
 Marcin "Martin" Rygiel – bass

Production
 Decapitated – production
 Sławek and Wojtek Wiesławski – engineering (at Hertz Studio, Białystok, Poland, August 2005)
 Spiros Antoniou – front cover and design
 Jacek Wisniewski – layout
 Marta Filewicz, Kastor, ARS, Tim from Boston – lyrics revision and consultation

Release history

References

Decapitated (band) albums
Earache Records albums
Teichiku Records albums
2006 albums
Albums with cover art by Spiros Antoniou